The "rural purge" of American television networks (in particular CBS) was a series of cancellations in the early 1970s of still-popular rural-themed shows with demographically skewed audiences, the majority of which occurred at the end of the 1970–71 television season.  In addition to rural-themed shows such as  Mayberry R.F.D., The Beverly Hillbillies and its spinoffs Petticoat Junction and Green Acres, the cancellations ended several highly rated variety shows that had been on CBS since the beginning of television broadcasting. CBS saw a dramatic change in direction with the shift, moving away from shows with rural themes and toward more appeal to urban and suburban audiences.

Background 
Starting with The Real McCoys, a 1957 ABC program, U.S. television had undergone a "rural revolution", programs with a focus on situation comedies featuring "naïve but noble 'rubes' from deep in the American heartland". CBS was the network most associated with the trend, with series such as The Andy Griffith Show, The Beverly Hillbillies, Green Acres, Lassie, Petticoat Junction, and Hee Haw. CBS aired so many of these rural-themed shows, many produced by Filmways, that it gained the nicknames the "Country Broadcasting System" and the "Hillbilly Network", a parody of their own preferred nickname, the Tiffany Network.

By 1966, industry executives were lamenting the lack of diversity in American television offerings and the dominance of rural-oriented programming on the Big Three television networks of the era, noting that "ratings indicate that the American public prefer hillbillies, cowboys, and spies".

CBS vice president Michael Dann personally hated the rural-oriented programming he was airing (as did most television executives), but he kept the shows on the air in acknowledgement of their strong overall ratings, which he considered the most important measure of a program's success. Dann's superior, CBS president James T. Aubrey, likewise believed rural sitcoms were a crucial part of the network's formula for success, noting that at the time, advertisers wanted the audience that watched rural sitcoms. Robert Wood, an incoming president of CBS, pressured Dann to cancel the rural programs.  Dann was forced out shortly after his response to Wood: "Just because the people who buy refrigerators are between 26 and 35 and live in Scarsdale, you should not beam your programming only at them."

Instigation 
As summarized for the Museum of Broadcast Communications:
By the late 1960s, … many viewers, especially young ones, were rejecting [rural-themed] shows as irrelevant to modern times. Mayberry's total isolation from contemporary problems was part of its appeal, but more than a decade of media coverage of the civil rights movement had brought about a change in the popular image of the small Southern town. Gomer Pyle, U.S.M.C., was set on a U.S. Marine base between 1964 and 1969, but neither Gomer nor any of his fellow Marines ever mentioned the war in Vietnam. CBS executives, afraid of losing the lucrative youth demographic, purged their schedule of hit shows that were drawing huge but older-skewing audiences.

The 1970 cuts were preceded in 1967, for similar reasons of viewer demographics, when CBS ordered cancellation of its remaining game shows, Password, What's My Line?, I've Got a Secret, and To Tell the Truth; the last continued in daytime for another year. These programs were still extremely profitable (mainly because of their low budgets, and thus they would all be revived within a few years) but performed poorly in demographics. The network attempted to incorporate more urban programming, including the innovative sitcom He & She in the 1967 season, but a clash with that show's lead-in (Green Acres) led to its cancellation. The Smothers Brothers Comedy Hour, likewise an innovative and far more successful program that appealed to a younger audience, also debuted in 1967.

The wave of cancellations was instigated by CBS executive Robert Wood, who replaced longtime CBS programming head Dann with Fred Silverman, following research highlighting the greater attraction to advertisers of the young adult urban viewer demographic. Much of CBS's existing product either drew audiences that were too old and rural, or drew another undesirable demographic: kids, who lacked disposable income of their own.

Popularity of canceled shows 
Gomer Pyle, U.S.M.C. was the first of the rural-based shows to leave the air, not due to its theme but because of Jim Nabors' desire to "reach for another rung on the ladder, either up or down". He was given a new show, The Jim Nabors Hour, as a replacement for the next season.

Mayberry R.F.D., a direct continuation of The Andy Griffith Show, finished fourth for 1969 and was renewed for two more seasons, but ratings had slipped to 15th by its final season.

The first of the cancellations was The Red Skelton Show, which had finished the 1969–70 season as the number seven show. It had however fallen out of the top 30 by 1971 after its move to NBC.

The success of The Mary Tyler Moore Show, All in the Family, and newer, more urban variety shows such as The Carol Burnett Show in 1967 and The Flip Wilson Show in 1970 (on arch-rival NBC), allowed cancellations of most of the "undesired shows" at the end of 1971, despite their high ratings and popularity. Both Green Acres and The Beverly Hillbillies had dropped from the Nielsen top 30 by the 1970–71 season, yet both shows continued to win their respective time slots and had loyal followings, warranting renewal for another season. Other shows that were still pulling in even higher ratings when they were canceled included Mayberry R.F.D., which finished the season at number 15, Hee Haw at number 16, and The Jim Nabors Hour at number 29.

Replacement shows 
Much of the programming that was axed was not directly replaced. The Prime Time Access Rule had forced the networks to surrender the 7:30 p.m. Eastern Time time slot back to its affiliates, which was another part of the impetus for the rural purge. Lassie and Hee Haw almost immediately went into first-run syndication, where stations (many of them CBS affiliates) usually aired the shows in the fringe time slot that the networks had been forced to surrender. (Several other network cast-offs that had been axed for similar reasons, such as ABC's The Lawrence Welk Show and NBC's Wild Kingdom, earned similar extensions of their runs through syndication at the same time.)

For the time slots that the networks retained, CBS head Fred Silverman replaced much of the canceled programming in 1971 and 1972 with "relevant" fare. Following All in the Family were its many spinoffs including Maude (debuting in 1972) and The Jeffersons (which premiered in 1975). Following the success of The Mary Tyler Moore Show, the series' production company MTM Productions would develop the popular The Bob Newhart Show. M*A*S*H was added to the network in 1972, placing in the top 15 shows for ten of its eleven seasons, and eventually aired the most watched single episode of any series in U.S. television history during its 1983 series finale.

A side effect of the rural purge was the reduction of the laugh track. Most of the rural-oriented programs were filmed in the single-camera setup without a studio audience, with the canned laughter added by laugh-track proprietor Charley Douglass. The newer shows that came to television in the early 1970s were multiple-camera setups with live studio audiences, a trend that would become the norm throughout the 1970s and even into today, with Douglass's laugh track mostly limited to sweetening. This was not possible for M*A*S*H, which was filmed on location, but due to the occasionally serious nature of the material, producers of the military hospital dramedy did not want a laugh track to be used. CBS compromised by excluding use of a laugh track in certain scenes, including the operating room.

Under Silverman's watch, game shows returned to the network's daytime schedule during this period, as well. (Unlike NBC or ABC, CBS had not carried a daytime game show since To Tell the Truth ended its run in 1968, instead opting for reruns of 1960s prime-time sitcoms such as The Lucy Show and Gomer Pyle, U.S.M.C., both of which had left the air by that point.) The first of these shows was The Amateur's Guide to Love, which ran for three months in the spring and summer of 1972. Shortly afterward, on September 4, the network debuted three new game shows: The New Price Is Right, Gambit, and The Joker's Wild. Gambit ran until 1976 and returned in 1980 for an additional year as Las Vegas Gambit on NBC; Joker ended its CBS run in 1975, then later ran in syndication from 1977 to 1986; and Price is in its 50th season as of September 2021.

Despite the relatively large number of "old guard" variety shows canceled in the purge, Silverman actually continued to create new variety shows to replace the ones he had canceled; one of the first was The Sonny & Cher Show, which debuted in February 1971 and would last until Sonny and Cher divorced in 1974. (Silverman then retained Cher's services, signing her to her own show in 1976, after which she agreed to reunite professionally with Sonny for its last year on air, before it ended in 1977). Silverman would later commission Donny & Marie for ABC five years later. He would also, with less success, commission The Brady Bunch Hour for ABC in 1976 and Pink Lady and Jeff and The Susan Anton Show for NBC in 1980, all three of which were received poorly. NBC tried a big, splashy 90-minute variety show entitled The Big Show that debuted in March 1980, but it was cancelled after only two months.

Several conservative members of Congress, as well as President Richard Nixon and members of his administration, expressed displeasure at some of the replacement shows, many of which (especially the more socially conscious shows such as All in the Family) were not particularly "family-friendly". The backlash from the purge prompted CBS to commission a rural family drama, The Waltons, for its fall 1972 schedule based on the TV film The Homecoming: A Christmas Story (1971). The network scheduled it in what it thought would be a death slot against popular series The Flip Wilson Show and The Mod Squad, allegedly hoping the show would underperform and head to a quick cancellation. Instead, the show proved to be an instant hit, prompting CBS to change course and put its full support behind the show; The Waltons went on to run for nine seasons, reaching as high as second in the Nielsens and finishing in the top 30 for seven of its nine years on air, and would become a perennial fixture in syndicated reruns for decades thereafter. The success of The Waltons started a trend for family dramas throughout the 1970s; such as Little House on the Prairie, Apple's Way, Family, and Eight Is Enough.

For four decades after the purge, few sitcoms of note were set in the South, and many of those were set in urban or suburban communities. One media critic stated that only four of note had been made—House of Payne, Meet the Browns (both from Atlanta-based Tyler Perry), Designing Women and The Carmichael Show. Of these, the first three are set in Atlanta or its metropolitan area, and the fourth is set in Charlotte. Other examples include Evening Shade, a Burt Reynolds vehicle set in a fictionalized version of Evening Shade, Arkansas; The Golden Girls, set in Miami, Florida and featuring the identifiably Southern Blanche Devereaux and rural Rose Nylund as main characters; Mama's Family, set in a Southernized version of Raytown, Missouri and featuring Mayberry RFD star Ken Berry in a major supporting role; and the animated sitcom King of the Hill, which ran for 13 seasons on the FOX Network and featured a caricature of suburban Texas life.

Related cancellations 
Non-rural-themed shows canceled by CBS included sitcoms Family Affair and Hogan's Heroes in 1971, with the long-running My Three Sons ending in 1972. Variety shows that had been around since the late 1940s and early 1950s, such as The Jackie Gleason Show and The Ed Sullivan Show, were canceled in 1970 and 1971, respectively; likewise, The Original Amateur Hour (a stalwart of network television since its debut, and before that on radio since 1934) ended on its own accord in 1970 due to the show's aging demographics. The Red Skelton Show was canceled by CBS at the end of the 1969–70 season, and was picked up by NBC (the series' original network) for one more season. NBC also reverted Skelton's show to its original half-hour format in place of its more familiar hour-long format on CBS. By the end of 1972, Lucille Ball remained the only long-time star from television's golden era to still have her own show. Ball's show, Here's Lucy, still rated in the Nielsen top ten and continued to pull in high ratings until its end in 1974.

TV westerns were another genre targeted for cancellation; martial artist Bruce Lee, in attempting to pitch his series The Warrior to television networks, stated he was told "the Western idea is out." Apart from Gunsmoke and Bonanza, two prime-time staples which in 1971 had been on the air for a combined 28 years (and continued to air until 1975 and 1973, respectively), most of the shows in the genre were already off the air at the time of the purge. NBC canceled two of the remaining Westerns in 1971, The Virginian and The High Chaparral. The 1971 plan of CBS included cancellation of Gunsmoke at the end of the 1970–71 season, while Mayberry R.F.D. and Family Affair were renewed for the 1971–72 season; Fred Silverman and Robert Wood both favored cancelling Gunsmoke over Mayberry R.F.D. and Family Affair. This was revised due to Gunsmoke's Top-10 ratings, ranking #5 in the Nielsen Ratings for the 1970–71 season, rising to #4 in the 1971–72 season. Another factor was that Gunsmoke was the favorite TV program of Barbara Paley, wife of CBS Chief Executive William Paley. Westerns had already been targeted by parents' groups opposing television violence, those concerned about portrayals of Native Americans, and the genre's popularity was fading in the face of overexposure; following a boom in the format's popularity in the 1960s, the last new traditional TV westerns debuted in 1968.

ABC seriously considered picking up Family Affair for its 1971–72 primetime schedule to join its Friday night lineup alongside two other shows with similar audiences (The Brady Bunch and The Partridge Family), but concluded that Family Affair had run its course.

See also 
 "The Lawrence Welk-Hee Haw Counter-Revolution Polka"

References

Further reading
 Rube Tube: CBS and Rural Comedy in the Sixties by Sara K. Eskridge, University of Missouri Press (2018)

 
Television terminology
CBS Television Network
The Beverly Hillbillies
Mass media-related controversies in the United States
Rural culture in the United States